The Natashquan  is a river in the Canadian provinces of Quebec and Newfoundland and Labrador. It flows south into the Gulf of Saint Lawrence.

Geography

The river has its source just south of the boundary between the Atlantic and Saint Lawrence river watersheds. 
It flows south-east to the Labrador–Quebec border from where it flows southward to the Gulf.
It lies between the basins of the Aguanish River to the west and the Kegaska River to the east.
About 39.8% of the basin is in Labrador north of the provincial boundary.

The river has a Strahler number of 7.
The name is of Innu origin, who call it Nutahquaniu Hipu, meaning "river where black bear is hunted".

Together with the Moisie River, the Natashquan is one of the most renowned salmon rivers on the North Shore of the Gulf.

Geology
The river largely runs through narrow valleys, and is fed by about 30 tributaries, of which the most significant are in downstream order: the Lejamtel, Mercereau, Mahkunipiu, Mistanipisipou, East Natashquan, Pehatnaniskau, Doré, West Natashquan, and Akaku Rivers.

The last  of the river forms a large sandy estuary, separated from the gulf by Natashquan Point and Cape Tiennot. Sainte-Hélène Island (île Sainte-Hélène) is located at the very mouth of the river.

The climate of the basin is subarctic continental, with a short growing season. The upper portion has a cold subhumid climate, whereas the lower part is humid.

History
In 1534, Jacques Cartier sailed by the area and named Cape Thiennot after a ship captain that had settled at that location. The river was mapped in 1684 by Louis Jolliet who called it "Noutascoüan". Jacques-Nicolas Bellin identified it as "Grand R. Natachquoin" on his map of 1744, while the 1776 map by Carver showed "Great Natashkwen".

From as early as 1710, a trading post was established on the left (south) bank of the Natashquan River and later on the opposite bank (at the river's mouth at present-day Natashquan FN Reserve) to conduct fur trade with the indigenous Innu people. The post was acquired by the Hudson's Bay Company in the middle of the 19th century, but abandoned circa 1914 due to lack of profitability.

A bridge carrying Quebec Route 138 across the river was opened on September 26, 2013.

Conservation
The reserve, mostly within the Petit-Mécatina unorganized territory, will extend  along the Natashquan River southward from the Labrador–Quebec border and also include  of the East Natashquan River.

The landscape of proposed reserve is deemed to have great beauty, exceptional value, recognized heritage interest, and considerable cultural interest. Therefore, the reserve is meant to protect favourable Atlantic salmon habitats, biodiversity of aquatic and riparian habitats, and old-growth forests. It will also manage sustainable harvesting of fur-bearing animals and develop tourism opportunities, while prohibiting mining, forestry, and hydro-electric development.

In May 2015 the Ministry of Forests, Wildlife and Parks of Quebec announced a sport fishing catch-and-release program for large salmon on sixteen of Quebec's 118 salmon rivers.
These were the Mitis, Laval, Pigou, Bouleau, aux Rochers, Jupitagon, Magpie, Saint-Jean, Corneille, Piashti, Watshishou, Little Watshishou, Nabisipi, Aguanish and Natashquan rivers.
The Quebec Atlantic Salmon Federation said that the measures did not go nearly far enough in protecting salmon for future generations.
In view of the rapidly declining Atlantic salmon population catch-and-release should have been implemented on all rivers apart from northern Quebec.

See also
 Natashquan, Quebec, municipality
 Minganie Regional County Municipality, Quebec, MRC
 Le Golfe-du-Saint-Laurent Regional County Municipality, Quebec, MRC
 Côte-Nord (North-Shore)
 List of rivers of Quebec

References

Sources

External links
 Geology of the Natashquan River

Rivers of Newfoundland and Labrador
Rivers of Côte-Nord
Labrador